Teʼ Kʼab Chaak ("Tree Branch Rain God") was a Mayan king (ajaw) of Caracol in Belize. He was a founder of the Caracol dynasty.

Two retrospective references to Teʼ Kʼab Chaak in Late Classic texts place him in the middle of the fourth century AD; that a king from this early era should continue to be talked about hundreds of years later suggests that he was the dynasty founder.

Marc Zender cautions that the translation of Teʼ Kʼab Chaak's name as "Tree Branch Rain God" is unlikely, given that kʼabte''' (literally "arm (of) tree"), rather than teʼkʼab'', would be the expected order of elements in Mayan for the meaning "tree branch".

Zender suggests a translation like "Tree-Armed Chaak" or "Trees are the Arms of Chaak".

References

Kings of Caracol
4th century in the Maya civilization
4th-century monarchs in North America